Georgia Lee Wareham (born 26 May 1999) is an Australian cricketer who plays for the national cricket team as a leg spin bowler. At the domestic level, she plays for Victoria and the Melbourne Renegades. In April 2018, she played six matches on an Under 19 tour of South Africa, taking a total of nine wickets including 4–17 in a 50-over match against the Emerging South Africa team.

Career 
In September 2018, she was named in Australia's squad for the Women's Twenty20 International (WT20I) series against New Zealand. She made her WT20I for Australia against New Zealand on 29 September 2018.

In October 2018, she was named in Australia's squad for the 2018 ICC Women's World Twenty20 tournament in the West Indies. She made her Women's One Day International cricket (WODI) debut for Australia Women against Pakistan Women on 18 October 2018.

In November 2018, she was named in the Melbourne Renegades' squad for the 2018–19 Women's Big Bash League season. The International Cricket Council (ICC) named Wareham as one of the five breakout stars in women's cricket in 2018.

In April 2019, Cricket Australia awarded her with her first full contract ahead of the 2019–20 season. In June 2019, Cricket Australia named her in Australia's team for their tour to England to contest the Women's Ashes. In January 2020, she was named in Australia's squad for the 2020 ICC Women's T20 World Cup in Australia.

In August 2021, Wareham was named in Australia's squad for their series against India, which included a one-off day/night Test match as part of the tour. Wareham made her Test debut on 30 September 2021, for Australia against India.

WPL 
In the inaugural season of WPL in 2023, Georgia Wareham was bought by Gujarat Giants for 75 Lakhs.

References

Further reading

External links

Georgia Wareham at Cricket Australia

1999 births
Living people
Australia women Test cricketers
Australia women One Day International cricketers
Australia women Twenty20 International cricketers
Cricketers from Victoria (Australia)
Melbourne Renegades (WBBL) cricketers
Gujarat Giants (WPL) cricketers
Sportswomen from Victoria (Australia)
Victoria women cricketers